Club Esportiu Bàsquet Llíria is a basketball club based in Llíria, Spain. It played in Liga ACB from 1991 to 1993.

History
CB Llíria, also known during the 1990s as Ferrys Llíria by sponsorship reasons, promoted to Liga ACB in 1991 and remained in the league two seasons before being relegated again.

In 1994, the club tried to inscribe again in Liga ACB, but it was rejected by the Association. After years in the court, in 2002, Justice ruled in favor of the ACB.

In 2001, the club was re-founded as Club Esportiu Bàsquet Llíria and played in LEB Plata two seasons. Nowadays, the club plays in Liga EBA, fourth tier in Spanish basketball.

Season by season

References

External links
Profile at Eskudoteka
Profile at ACB.com

Basketball teams in the Valencian Community
Former Liga ACB teams
Former LEB Plata teams
Former Liga EBA teams